William Williams (born 1856) was a Welsh amateur footballer who played most of his football career with the Druids club of Ruabon. Generally playing at half-back, he made eleven appearances for Wales between 1876 and 1883.

Football career
Williams was born in Ruabon, Denbighshire and was trained as a chimney top maker, working for one of the clay works at Afongoch.

He joined the Druids club in 1874 and in his time with the club, he appeared in eight finals of the Welsh Cup, winning the trophy five times.

In February 1876, he took part in trials organised by the Druids' founder, Llewelyn Kenrick, to select Welsh players to represent their country in a match against Scotland. The match was played at Hamilton Crescent, Partick, the home of the West of Scotland Cricket Club on 25 March 1876, with Williams playing at left-half in a 2–2–6 formation. The Welsh were well defeated, conceding four goals without reply.

Williams was not selected for the return match against Scotland in 1877 and his second international appearance came on 23 March 1878, in a 6–0 defeat by Scotland at the original Hampden Park.

A week later, on 30 March 1878, Druids played in the final of the inaugural Welsh Cup tournament, losing 1–0 to local rivals Wrexham.

Known as "little Billy", Williams became a stalwart of the Druids side, who "could run all day" and "had endless reserves of stamina", although "never a subtle player"; his strong points were his "perfect tackling" and his "vigorous support" of the forwards. In a report on one match, it was said that "he puts a stop to many a dangerous run, he is a most effective player though not one of the fastest. He outlasted all of his contemporaries, continuing to play for the Druids until 1890. He spent the 1878–79 season at Oswestry, when Druids were temporarily without a ground and also made occasional appearances for Bootle, where R A Lythgoe, the former Druids official, was now club secretary.

At international level, he missed only four of the first 15 Welsh international matches and reserved his best performances for matches against Scotland, earning him the nickname of "Scotty".

International appearances
Williams made eleven appearances for Wales in official international matches, as follows:

Honours
Druids
Welsh Cup winners: 1880, 1881, 1882, 1885, 1886
Welsh Cup runners-up: 1878, 1883, 1884

References 

1856 births
People from Ruabon
Sportspeople from Wrexham County Borough
Year of death missing
Welsh footballers
Druids F.C. players
Oswestry Town F.C. players
Bootle F.C. (1879) players
Wales international footballers
Association football midfielders